Queen City FC was an American soccer team based in Buffalo, New York, United States. Founded in 2006, the team played in the National Premier Soccer League (NPSL), a national amateur league at the fourth tier of the American Soccer Pyramid, until 2008, when the franchise was sold to Mike Share in October 2008 and the team changed names to Buffalo City FC.

The team played its home games All-High Stadium. The team's colors were sky blue and black.

The Front Office consisted of: Executive Director and General Manager, Christopher Keem; Controller, Dennis Behrens; Director of Community Outreach, Micheal Strangio; Technical Director, Brendan Murphy; Director of Field Hockey (offshoot of Queen City FC), Jessica Murphy; Director of Scouting, Kevin Brenner; Transportation Coordinator, Jake Szopinski ; Director of Media Relations, Ryan Knapp; Strength and Conditioning, Chris Nentarz.

Supporters Group was led by Jamey Vann, and the name was "The O'Block"

Queen City FC is also the name of an unrelated youth soccer club based in South Burlington, founded in 2011 by Shane Bufano.

History

Queen City FC was started by former professional and college players looking for a side to support in the Greater Buffalo area, with the only high level football played in the area being in Rochester with the Rochester Raging Rhinos, and the MLS expansion team Toronto FC in Toronto.
In 2007, Queen City FC won the northeast division and competed for the National NPSL Finals only to lose by one goal.  Their debut season can be noted as one of the most successful debut seasons in Buffalo sports history.
After a successful two seasons, their franchise rights were transferred to Buffalo City FC. Buffalo City FC would later become FC Buffalo in 2009.

Players

Player Roster (2006–2008)

Year-by-year

Honors
 NPSL Northeast Division Champions (2007)
 NPSL National Finalist (2007)

Head coaches
  Michael Middleton (2007)
  Thomas Cordaro (2007–2008)

Stadia
 All-High Stadium; Buffalo, New York (2007–2008)

Supporters
The club's supporters group were known as "The O-Block".

External links
National Premier Soccer League
Queen City FC MySpace
Queen City Football Club website

National Premier Soccer League teams
Sports in Buffalo, New York
Association football clubs established in 2006
Men's soccer clubs in New York (state)
2006 establishments in New York (state)
2008 disestablishments in New York (state)
Association football clubs disestablished in 2008
Defunct soccer clubs in New York (state)